Loikaw is the capital of Kayah State in Myanmar. It is located in the Karen Hills area, near the State's northern tip, just above an embayment on the Pilu River. The inhabitants are mostly Kayah (Karenni).

The town of Loikaw comprises 13 urban wards, namely Naungya, Daw-ukhu, Mainglon, Mingala, Dhammayon, Zaypaing, Shwetaung, Landama, Dawtanma, Dawnoeku, Shansu, and Minsu wards.

History
 
Loikaw was the Headquarters of the Political Officer in Charge of the Karenni States, part of the Princely States of British Burma, in 1922 during British rule in Burma. The town was located in the only flat part of the Karenni area. In 1892 it numbered four huts. As an Agent of the British government he was exercising control over the local Karenni Rulers, being supervised by the Superintendent at Taunggyi. The headquarters of the American Baptist Mission to Hill Karens was also located in Loikaw.

As with the rest of Kayah State, outsider access to Loikaw has been restricted post-independence, with special permits required to secure entry. Since the 2021 coup, Loikaw has been the scene of intense fighting between the Burmese military and ethnic armed groups opposed to military control, forcing many of the city's residents to flee.

Demographics

2014

The 2014 Myanmar Census reported that Loikaw had a population of 51,349, constituting 40.0% of Loikaw Township's total population.

Climate
Loikaw has a tropical savanna climate (Köppen Aw) bordering on a humid subtropical climate (Cwa).

Transport 

Air

Loikaw is linked to Yangon and Mandalay by air.

Rail

Loikaw is linked by the newly constructed Aungpan-Pinlaung-Loikaw rail line.

Buses

There are express buses from loikaw to Yangon, Mandalay and other towns.

Education 

The town is home to Loikaw University, Technological University, Loikaw, Computer University, Loikaw. Loikaw Education College

Health care 
Loikaw General Hospital serves not only locals in the state but also to those in the southern part of neighbouring Shan State. The existing buildings of the hospital were built in 1964. Due to increase demands, new two two-storey buildings were constructed with the 1.945 billion yen funding from Japan International Cooperation Agency (JICA).

See also 
 Loikaw Airport
Kayah State Cultural Museum
Lawpita Hydropower Plants

References

External links

Township capitals of Myanmar
Populated places in Kayah State